Loustau is a surname. Notable people with the surname include:

César Loustau (1926–2011), Uruguayan architect and architectural historian
Félix Loustau (1922–2003), Argentine footballer
Juan Carlos Loustau (born 1947), Argentine football referee
Ludovic Loustau (born 1973), French rugby union player
Patricio Loustau (born 1975), Argentine football referee

See also
Maurice Loustau-Lalanne, Seychelles politician